Josh Alexander may refer to:

Josh Alexander (basketball) (born 1987), American basketball player
Josh Alexander (songwriter), American songwriter and producer
Josh Alexander (wrestler) (born 1987), Canadian professional wrestler

See also
Joshua W. Alexander (1852–1936), United States Secretary of Commerce of 1919–1921